Ebhoni Jade Cato-O’Garro, known by her stage name Ebhoni, is a Canadian musician and model of Antiguan, Jamaican, and Indigenous descent. She released her debut EP Mood Ring (2017), at the age of 17. Her EP X was released on February 18, 2021. She has also modeled for Adidas and Rihanna's Savage X Fenty lingerie line.

Early life and career 
Ebhoni grew up in Toronto's Weston Road neighbourhood, before moving to Oshawa with her mother and sister after her parents divorced. As of 2019, she lived in Parkdale. Ebhoni entered her first singing competition at the age of nine at the Canadian National Exhibition. She began recording music at age 10 and started writing songs at age 11. She started uploading videos to YouTube including covers of songs by artists such as Beyoncé and Keyshia Cole, as well as original songs. In 2017, she released her EP Mood Ring on SoundCloud, where it would receive over 2 million streams. She then released an EP titled X in February 2021 and a mixtape titled Good Dick & Weed in July 2021.

Discography

EPs 
Mood Ring (2017)

X (2021)

Mixtapes 
Good Dick & Weed (2021)

References 

21st-century Canadian women singers
Year of birth missing (living people)
Living people
Canadian rhythm and blues singers